This article shows the rosters of all participating teams at the men's volleyball tournament at the 2012 Summer Paralympics in London.

Pool A

The following is the Egypt roster in the men's volleyball tournament of the 2012 Summer Paralympics.

Head coach: Mansour El Mohamdy

The following is the German roster in the men's volleyball tournament of the 2012 Summer Paralympics.

Head coach: Rudi Sonnenbichler

The following is the British roster in the men's volleyball tournament of the 2012 Summer Paralympics.

Head coach: Ian LeGrand

The following is the Moroccan roster in the men's volleyball tournament of the 2012 Summer Paralympics.

The following is the Russian roster in the men's volleyball tournament of the 2012 Summer Paralympics.

Head coach: Viktor Dyakov

Pool B

The following is the Bosnian roster in the men's volleyball tournament of the 2012 Summer Paralympics.

Head coach: Mirza Hrustemović

The following is the Brazilian roster in the men's volleyball tournament of the 2012 Summer Paralympics.

The following is the Chinese roster in the men's volleyball tournament of the 2012 Summer Paralympics.

Head coach: Liu Fangqing

The following is the Iranian roster in the men's volleyball tournament of the 2012 Summer Paralympics.

Head coach: Hadi Rezaei

The following is the Rwandan roster in the men's volleyball tournament of the 2012 Summer Paralympics.

See also
Volleyball at the 2012 Summer Paralympics – Women's team rosters

References

External links
FIVB official website

O
2
Men's team rosters